Susanne Berckhemer (born 20 March 1978, in Augsburg) is a German actress. She graduated in 1997, having studied at the Bavarian August Everding Theatre Academy in Munich, where she gained a degree in comedy.

Susanne Berckhemer played many roles in the series Tatort and in Verliebt in Berlin in the role of Britta Haas. She also played the role of the antagonist Nadine Dannenberg, in the series Tessa – Leben für die Liebe. In August 2007, she acted in the series Rosamunde Pilcher - Sieg der Liebe, in the main role of Emma Clark. She acted in the successful series Wege zum Glück, until July 2008 (episode 703, shown on 20 October 2008 on  ZDF), in the main role of Luisa Becker (born Maywald).

As well as a career as an actress, Susanne tried to explore her origins in a project with her friend, the dramaturgist Dagmar Domrös. In Sibiu, the European Cultural capital of 2007, the play Ein Dorf erzählt... Zalina was performed in the village of Hosman (Romania), along with Spree Agent and other collaborative artists. Susanne stated that the objective was to benefit the young inhabitants of the Romanian village to experience cultural pursuits such as the theatre. An association named after her was created in the area. 

Susanne Berckhemer became a mother in January 2009. She lives with her child and companion Thorsten Werner, in Berlin.

Filmography 
Cinema and television
 2001 : Das Mädcheninternat - Deine Schreie wird niemand hören (TV series Die Insel der Angst)
 2004 : Tatort (episode Eine leiche zuviel)
 2006 : Tatort (episode Gebrochene Herzen)
 2005-2006 : Verliebt in Berlin, series
 2006 : Tessa – Leben für die Liebe, série
 2007 : Rosamunde Pilcher (episode Sieg der Liebe)
 2007-2008 : Wege zum Glück, series
 2009 : Wege zum Glück, series (guest)
 2009 : Leipzig Homicide, series

Short films
 1998 : L'Image fantôme
 1998 : Insomnia
 1999 : Kümmel und Korn

Adverts 
 2007 : Uncle Ben's Express Reis (video)

Notes and references

External links 
 
 Artistic agent of Susanne Berckhemer
 Susanne Berckhemer on the official ZDF site: Wege zum Glück
 Susanne Berckhemer on the official Sat1 site: Verliebt in Berlin
 Susanne Berckhemer on the show- Volle Kanne auf der Berlinale, 15 February 2008
 Susanne Berckhemer on a video-chat organised by the channel ZDF, 8 April 2008
 Susanne Berckhemer special invitation on the show Lafer! Lichter! Lecker !, 17 May 2008
 Susanne Berckhemer on the show Volle Kanne, 16 October 2008

German film actresses
Actors from Augsburg
1978 births
Living people
German television actresses
Actresses from Berlin